Shangjing may refer to:

Historical capitals
Shangjing Longquanfu, capital of Balhae, in modern Ning'an, Heilongjiang, China
Bairin Left Banner, in Inner Mongolia, China, site of former capital of the Liao dynasty
Huining Prefecture, capital of the Jin dynasty (1115-1234), in modern Harbin, Heilongjiang, China

Modern locations
Shangjing, Datian County (上京镇), a town in Datian County, Fujian, China
Shangjing, Fuqing (上迳镇), a town in Fuqing, Fujian, China

See also 
Kamigyō-ku (上京), Kyōtō Japan